Erich Kemnitz (born 19 January 1936 in Berlin) is a retired West German sprint canoer who competed in the late 1960s and early 1970s. He won a silver medal in the K-4 10000 m event at the 1970 ICF Canoe Sprint World Championships in Copenhagen.

Kemnitz also competed in the K-4 1000 m event at the 1968 Summer Olympics in Mexico City, but was eliminated in the semifinals.

References

1936 births
Canoeists from Berlin
Canoeists at the 1968 Summer Olympics
German male canoeists
Living people
Olympic canoeists of West Germany
ICF Canoe Sprint World Championships medalists in kayak